}}

Kailan Ba Tama ang Mali? (International title: Ruins of Love / ) is a 2015 Philippine television drama romance series broadcast by GMA Network. The series is based on a 1986 Philippine film of the same title. Directed by Gil Tejada Jr., it stars Max Collins, Geoff Eigenmann, Empress Schuck and Dion Ignacio. It premiered on February 9, 2015 on the network's Afternoon Prime line up replacing Ang Lihim ni Annasandra. The series concluded on May 8, 2015 with a total of 63 episodes. It was replaced by Healing Hearts in its timeslot.

Cast and characters

Lead cast
 Max Collins as Amanda Realonda-Vasquez
 Geoff Eigenmann as Leonardo "Leo" Vasquez
 Dion Ignacio as Oliver Mallari
 Empress Schuck as Sonya Barcial

Supporting cast
 Shamaine Centenera-Buencamino as Aurora "Auring" Realonda
 Ryza Cenon as Margarita "Rita" Barcial
 Chariz Solomon as Bianca Quillamor
 Ash Ortega as Angeli Realonda
 Ervic Vijandre as Joseph Dela Cruz
 Ken Alfonso as Thomas Alejandro
 Mike Lloren as Randy Dela Cruz
 Lander Vera Perez as Victor Realonda

Episodes

February 2015

March 2015

April 2015

May 2015

Ratings
According to AGB Nielsen Philippines' Mega Manila household television ratings, the pilot episode of Kailan Ba Tama ang Mali? earned an 11.4% rating. While the final episode scored a 15.5% rating.

Accolades

References

External links
 
 

2015 Philippine television series debuts
2015 Philippine television series endings
Filipino-language television shows
GMA Network drama series
Philippine romance television series
Television shows set in Quezon City